The 1836 United States presidential election in Ohio took place between November 3 and December 7, 1836, as part of the 1836 United States presidential election. Voters chose twenty-one representatives, or electors to the Electoral College, who voted for President and Vice President.

Ohio voted for Whig candidate William Henry Harrison over Democratic candidate Martin Van Buren. Harrison won Ohio by a narrow margin of 4.31%. Ohio was the home state of William Henry Harrison.

Results

See also
 United States presidential elections in Ohio

References

Ohio
1836
1836 Ohio elections